Andrew Chin (born September 22, 1992) is an American professional baseball pitcher who is currently a free agent. He was drafted by the New York Yankees in the 15th round of the 2014 Major League Baseball draft.

Career

Amateur
Chin attended Buckingham Browne & Nichols in Cambridge, Massachusetts, where he was drafted in the 5th round (169th overall) by the Toronto Blue Jays in the 2011 MLB Draft. Chin committed to Boston College, where he pitched for the Boston College Eagles baseball team. He missed the 2012 season due to Tommy John surgery. In 2014, he pitched for the Chatham Anglers of the Cape Cod Baseball League.

New York Yankees
The New York Yankees selected Chin in the 15th round of the 2014 MLB draft. He made his professional debut with the rookie-level GCL Yankees, and also played for the Low-A Staten Island Yankees, posting a cumulative 5.27 ERA in 7 games. He returned to the GCL Yankees in 2015, and recorded a 2.92 ERA in 14 appearances. On March 21, 2016, Chin was released by the Yankees organization.

Trois-Rivières Aigles
On March 24, 2017, Chin signed with the Trois-Rivières Aigles of the Can-Am League. On June 1, Chin was released by Trois-Rivières after struggling to an 18.00 ERA in 3 appearances.

San Rafael Pacifics
Chin joined the San Rafael Pacifics of the Pacific Association for the 2019 season. In 13 games with the team, Chin recorded a 4-1 record and 1.86 ERA with 44 strikeouts in 38.2 innings of work. At the time of his signing with Sioux City, he was the Pacific Associations's ERA leader.

Sioux City Explorers
On July 21, 2019, Chin signed with the Sioux City Explorers of the American Association of Independent Professional Baseball. He was released by the team on August 14 after struggling to a 7.30 ERA in 4 games.

International career
Chin played for the Chinese national baseball team in the 2017 World Baseball Classic.

References

External links

1992 births
2017 World Baseball Classic players
American baseball players of Chinese descent
American expatriate baseball players in Canada
Baseball players from Massachusetts
Baseball pitchers
Boston College Eagles baseball players
Chatham Anglers players
Gulf Coast Yankees players
Living people
Sportspeople from Newton, Massachusetts
Staten Island Yankees players
Trois-Rivières Aigles players
Buckingham Browne & Nichols School alumni
Chinese baseball players